Radio Rock is an Italian local radio station that airs from Rome, that can be listened to in most of Lazio, and streams over the internet from its website.

It is called in such a way because it mainly transmits rock music 24 hours per day.
It started broadcasting in 1985, and since then it has steadily grown throughout the years. Its listeners overwhelm well-known radio stations' listeners of the Lazio Region and the capital, Rome. According to the Audi report on the first quarter of 2010 it reached  156,000 people daily (in average).
In 1998, when three of the founders left the radio (Artico, Castaldo and Andreani), the audience averaged 101,000 for the day.

It is well known in the Italian rock scene for bringing to the Roman musical scene famous international musicians, previously unknown in Italy. This has been possible since Radio Rock sponsors a number of concerts and events in Rome.
Thanks to this organization, Radio Rock has brought to the public attention a number of artists, such as Porcupine Tree, Elettrojoyce, the Bevis Frond, Ozric Tentacles and others.

Different disc jockeys have worked for Radio Rock since its foundation in 1985. Each dj brings a peculiar choice in musical selection but all of them deeply fond of music. Since 2004 Radio Rock Italia, a twin project of Italian rock music, is presented by only women dj's: Francesca, Anto, Marta, Tosca, Vane.

DJ list
  
 Emilio Pappagallo
 Matteo Catizone 
 Fabio Giannotti 
 Dj Armandino [now @ www.rockam.it]
 Dj Oreste [now @ www.rockam.it]
 Prince Faster [now @ www.rockam.it]
 Paolo Mazzullo [dead in 2010]
 Marco Terragni
 Margus
 Michele Luches (now @ Radio Città Futura)
 Massimo Di Roma
 Michele Properzi 
 Stefano Santoni
 Peter Sarram
 Faber Cucchetti (DJ in "Il Bombardone", 2000)
 Jelena Milic
 Gianni Ciaccio
 Marco Scozzafava (aka Marco Silvestri)
 Marco Cavalieri (now at www.rockam.it & www.radiorock.to)
 Gianpaolo Castaldo (founder,now at www.radiorock.to & Radio Città Futura)
 Giampiero Crisanti (now at www.radiorock.to)
 Franz Andreani (founder, now at www.radiorock.to)
 Marco Artico (founder, now at www.radiorock.to)
 Flavia Cardinali (now at www.radiorock.to)
 Baffo Jorg (owner of Metal Massacre Format, died in 2012)

Starting from Radio Rock, some disk jockeys founded Radio Rock "The Original" (www.radiorock.to) in 1999 and in 2008 won the "European Podcast Award" in Professional Category for Italy. In 2010 Paolo Mazzullo, one of the founders, had a stroke and died. After his death, in 2011 some of the disk jockeys working at the radio decided to leave RadioRock creating the project Rock AM on Radio Popolare Roma.

References

Mass media in Rome
Radio stations in Italy